A partial lunar eclipse took place on Saturday, October 28, 1939. It was a nearly total eclipse, with 98.77% of the Moon under Earth's umbral shadow. It was the last partial lunar eclipse of the first set of partial eclipses in Saros series 135 as well as the largest partial lunar eclipse of the 20th century.

Visibility

Related lunar eclipses

Half-Saros cycle
A lunar eclipse will be preceded and followed by solar eclipses by 9 years and 5.5 days (a half saros). This lunar eclipse is related to two total solar eclipses of Solar Saros 142.

Saros series 
It was part of Saros series 135.

Tritos series 
 Preceded: Lunar eclipse of November 27, 1928
 Followed: Lunar eclipse of September 26, 1950

Tzolkinex 
 Preceded: Lunar eclipse of September 14, 1932
 Followed: Lunar eclipse of December 8, 1946

See also
List of lunar eclipses
List of 20th-century lunar eclipses

Notes

External links

1939-10
1939 in science